is an arcade fighting game developed by Allumer and published by Taito in 1984. In 2005, it was later included in Taito Legends.

Gameplay
In Great Swordsman, one or two players can play while taking turns. Players control with two-way joystick and three buttons with different hit levels.  Each for creating different level attacks. Like in Data East's Karate Champ, buttons must be held. If they are released, the players' characters will revert to their standing animation. Moves can be defended against by intercepting the players' opponents' weapons with the players'.

The object of the game is to land a hit on the opponent or push him/her off the mat to score a point. There are fifteen levels with three different modes.  The first three are fencing, the next five are kendo, and the final seven are gladiator-based. After clearing all levels in one mode, the "VICTORY SCORE" will be added to the players' scores, even if any of them was tied with their opponents at the end. After fifteen levels are completed, the players start over in a higher difficulty setting and repeat after the next fifteen levels are also cleared.  There are also bonus levels where players must deflect arrows to score extra points.

Reception 
In Japan, Game Machine listed Great Swordsman on their September 1, 1984 issue as being the most-successful table arcade unit of the month.

See also
 Musashi no Ken – Tadaima Shugyō Chu'
 Gladiator Blandia, sequel to Gladiator''.

Reception

External links

Great Swordsman at arcade-history.com

1984 video games
Arcade video games
Fighting games
Allumer games
Romstar games
Multiplayer video games
Taito arcade games
Video games developed in Japan